The 2018–19 Metro Atlantic Athletic Conference (MAAC) men's basketball season began with practices in October 2018, followed by the start of the 2018–19 NCAA Division I men's basketball season on November 6th. Conference play started in January and concluded March 22, 2019. This season was the 38th season of MAAC basketball.

The MAAC season saw four teams spend considerable time being in first place; Rider, Monmouth, Canisius and Iona. Rider started MAAC play off strong, winning seven of their first eight MAAC games, and looking like they would prove the preseason #1 pick correct. But then a five-game losing streak left them at 7–6, and two games out of first place. Monmouth started the regular season 0–12 at one point, but rebounded when MAAC play started, posting a 9–4 conference mark by February 9. Then a four-game losing streak struck down the Hawks, knocking them out of first place. Canisius had a solid season, keeping up with Monmouth the whole way. Consecutive losses to Iona and Niagara late in the season struck down their first place hopes. Iona, which had won the MAAC Tournament three consecutive times coming into the season, started off 5–2, but like the others, a four-game losing streak left them at 5–6 in MAAC play. Sitting in sixth place, Iona found their new starting five combination, and reeled off seven straight wins to end the MAAC season, and take the regular season crown in 2019. It was the 11th MAAC regular season championship for the Gaels.

The 2019 MAAC tournament was held from March 7 through March 11 at the Times Union Center in Albany, New York. This marked the 20th time Albany has hosted the event. No. 1 seed Iona defeated No. 6 seed Monmouth in the championship game 81–60 to win the conference's automatic bid to the 2019 NCAA tournament. With the win, Iona became the first MAAC team to win four consecutive MAAC Tournament championships.

Quinnipiac was the first MAAC team of the season to see postseason action, as they accepted an invitation to participate in the 2019 CollegeInsider.com Postseason Tournament, losing to NJIT 81–92 in the first round. Iona received a No. 16 seed in the NCAA Tournament Midwest Region, and faced No. 1 seed North Carolina in the first round on March 22, 2019. Iona led 38–33 at halftime, but despite Iona making 10 of 21 3-point tries in the first half, North Carolina started the second half on a 32–11 run to take control of the game, winning 88–73.

Head coaches

Coaching changes 
On March 5, 2018, Marist head coach Mike Maker was fired. He finished at Marist with a four-year record of 28–97. Marist hired Saint Peter's coach John Dunne as Maker's successor on April 3.

On April 10, 2018, Seton Hall assistant coach Shaheen Holloway was hired as the new head coach at Saint Peter's.

On April 13, 2018, Siena head coach Jimmy Patsos resigned amid an investigation regarding abusive conduct and financial improprieties within the program. On May 2, the Saints hired Mount St. Mary's head coach Jamion Christian for the job.

Coaches 

Notes: 
 All records, appearances, titles, etc. are from time with current school only. 
 Year at school includes 2018–19 season.
 Overall and MAAC records are from time at current school and are before the beginning of the season.
 Previous jobs are head coaching jobs unless otherwise noted.

Preseason

Preseason Coaches Poll

() first place votes

Preseason All-MAAC teams

† denotes unanimous selection

Preseason Player of the Year

MAAC regular season

Conference matrix
This table summarizes the final head-to-head results between teams in conference play.

Player of the week
Throughout the regular season, the Metro Atlantic Athletic Conference offices named player(s) of the week and rookie(s) of the week.

Records against other conferences
2018–19 records against non-conference foes. Records shown for regular season only.

Postseason

MAAC Tournament

 2019 Metro Atlantic Athletic Conference Basketball Tournament, Times Union Center, Albany, New York

* denotes number of overtimes

NCAA Tournament 

 Game summary

CollegeInsider.com Tournament 

 Game summary

Honors and awards

MAAC Awards

† denotes unanimous selection

2018–19 Season final statistic leaders

Scoring leaders

Rebound leaders

Assist leaders

Block leaders

Steal leaders

3PT % leaders

References

External links
MAAC website